Paul Byrne Haring (born January 18, 1937) is an American politician. He served as a Democratic member in the Texas House of Representatives from 1961 to 1967.

References

1937 births
Living people
Democratic Party members of the Texas House of Representatives